Historical markers (Filipino: panandang pangkasaysayan, Spanish: marcador histórico or placa histórica) are installed by the National Historical Commission of the Philippines (NHCP) in the Philippines and places abroad that signify important events, persons, structures, and institutions in Philippine national and local histories. The plaques themselves are permanent signs installed by the NHCP in publicly visible locations on buildings, monuments, or in special locations. Local municipalities and cities can also install markers of figures and events of local significance. Though they may have the permission of the NHCP, these markers are barred from using the seal of the Republic of the Philippines.

While many Cultural Properties have historical markers installed, not all places marked with historical markers are designated into one of the particular categories of Cultural Properties.  As of January 2012, the total number of historical markers listed by the NHCP is 459; however, the number of markers from all these lists is more than 1,500.

History 

Before 1933, several civic efforts have been initiated to create monuments and to mark historic sites and events, such as Cry of Balintawak, José Rizal Monument, and the birthplace of Andrés Bonifacio. However, many more historical sites have not been recognized or marked.

The earliest predecessor of the National Historical Commission of the Philippines (NHCP) was the Philippine Historical Research and Markers Committee (PHRMC). Established on October 23, 1933 via Executive Order 451 during the governorship of Frank Murphy during the American colonial era, one of its tasks was to mark cultural and historical antiquities in Manila, which was later expanded to cover the rest of the Philippines. The first markers were installed in 1934, including ones for Church of San Agustin, Fort Santiago, Plaza McKinley, Roman Catholic Cathedral of Manila, San Sebastian Church, Concordia College, Manila Railroad Company, Dr. Lorenzo Negrao, and University of Santo Tomas (Intramuros site). Issuance of markers stopped during the Second World War. Some of these markers were either lost or destroyed during the war and new markers were installed as replacements for San Agustin Church and Manila Cathedral. Throughout the years, some markers have also been reportedly missing as they were stolen and sold as scrap metal. The installation of markers was continued by the successors of the PHRMC: the Philippines Historical Committee (PHC), National Historical Institute (NHI), and the National Historical Commission (NHCP). The standard style of markers has changed throughout the years.The language of the markers are mostly and primarily in Filipino, with markers also in English and Spanish. The first marker to contain a regional language was installed to commemorate the Cebu Provincial Capitol in Cebu City. The markers, both in Cebuano and Filipino, were installed in 2008. The first marker in Ilocano was installed to commemorate Mansion House in Baguio in 2009. The first marker in Kapampangan was installed to commemorate the Holy Rosary Parish Church in Angeles in 2017. Historical markers outside of the Philippines may also be written in the local language of the country where the marker is installed such as German in Berlin, Germany and French in Ghent, Belgium (both markers commemorate José Rizal). Two of the first markers outside of the Philippines were installed in Ghent, Belgium, commemorating the residence of José Rizal when the El Filibusterismo was published, and in Dezhou, China, commemorating Paduka Batara, a King of Sulu who paid tribute to the Yongle Emperor and died there. Both were installed in 1959.

Markers related to Rizal occur the most, and Filipino historian Teodoro A. Agoncillo revealed that during his time (he served the NHCP from 1963 to 1985), their efforts in the board were mostly spent on approving, discussing, and rewriting the marker texts. With the number of marker requests relating to Rizal, he joked “Aba! Pati ba naman eskinitang inihian ni Rizal ibig lagyan ng marker!” (What, they even want us to mark obscure side streets where Rizal relieved himself!).

In 2002, during the unveiling ceremony of the marker National Federation of Women's Clubs in the Philippines in Manila Hotel, former president Fidel Ramos joked that the curtain raising reminded him of striptease, and everybody laughed. That was the last time that the curtains were pulled upward, and from then, the unveiling involves curtain pulling instead.

In 2011, the NHCP stated that it will pursue more markers for Visayas and Mindanao for their further inclusion in national history, citing the concentration of markers in Luzon.

The Kudan, the Philippine embassy building in Tokyo, has been declared a national historical landmark by the NHCP and was granted a historical marker on March 3, 2014. It is the first overseas site to be granted such status. During the unveiling of the marker, Ambassador Manuel Lopez called the building as the crown jewel of Philippine foreign service.

On June 3, 2016, the NHCP, for the first time, installed a marker for a nameless personality. A marker was installed in Macabebe, commemorating the leader of the Battle of Bangkusay Channel, the "first native to give up his life for independence."

Quincentennial markers 

From March to October 2021, the NHCP and National Quincentennial Committee issued quincentennial markers as part of the 2021 Quincentennial Commemorations in the Philippines (QCP).

Thirty-four historical markers will be unveiled among several sites in regions of Mimaropa, Central Visayas, Eastern Visayas, Caraga, Zamboanga Peninsula, and Bangsamoro. The markers were installed on site with the help of the Department of the Interior and Local Government (DILG) and the Armed Forces of the Philippines. Of these markers, ten were installed in Eastern Visayas. The first marker unveiled was the Suluan marker in the island of the same name in Guiuan, Eastern Samar on March 16, 2021.

The markers collectively depict select events of the Magellan-Elcano voyage in the Philippine archipelago. Each marker consist of a pedestal with a globe motif on top as a finial. The tiltation of the globe element was also certified by the Philippine Space Agency. On one side of the pedestal is the commemoration plaque and on another side is a dust marble relief which has a design dependent on the specific site of the marker. The reliefs are made by sculptors Jonas Roces and Francis Apiles and are based on sketches by muralist Derrick Macutay. The NHCP described the designs as a deviation from typical "orientalist" depictions by foreigners of pre-colonial Filipinos as savages. The markers are an attempt to depict events of the expedition from a Filipino point of view.

Criteria and policies 
The following are the policies issued by the NHCP on the installation of markers:
 Markers shall be installed for Filipino heroes, historic events and places involving historical acts and patriotic endeavors to dramatize the need to focus to the national consciousness the history of our country from the Filipino viewpoint and to evoke pride in our national heritage and identity.
 Installation of historical markers that honor Filipino heroes shall be undertaken after proper and thorough study.
 Historical markers shall only be installed in places with great historical value as determined by the NHI Board.
 Historical markers for religious personalities maybe installed in recognition of social or historical value.
 Historical marker shall not be installed to honor persons deceased less than fifty years, unless they are considered outstanding figures.
 Request for historical markers may be granted during the centenary year of deserving persons, places or structures.
 Historical markers shall not be installed in honor of persons who are still living.
 Historical markers may be installed in honor of foreigners, only in exceptional cases.
 Markers of local significance shall be allowed upon approved application to the NHI provided they are installed and financed by the agency, person or organization making the request and in such cases, the seal of the Republic of the Philippines shall not be allowed to be used.
 In consonance with the national policy, all texts of historical markers shall be in the National Language.
 The historical marker shall have a uniform design, size and materials. The NHI shall exercise the exclusive right (patent) over its use and production.
 The historical markers are government property. Any act to destroy or remove the said markers without the written authority from the NHI Board shall be charged criminally in accordance with existing laws. The NHI shall conceptualize the standard design, size and materials of the pedestals for the historical marker.
 To ensure the protection, upkeep and maintenance of the historical markers, the NHI and the client (i.e. local executives, descendant of the hero, etc.) shall both officially agree and sign the Certificate of Transfer.

Issues 

Some historical markers have also caused issues and controversies due to different reasons. 
 Baguio City Hall – Markers have also been used to justify the historicity of the place and help preserve the area, like in the issue of developing the City Hall site in Baguio. Despite the lack of resolutions or consultations, former NHCP Chairperson Maria Serena Diokno affirmed the historical significance of the area against alterations on the historical site under the National Cultural Heritage Act. 
 Blood Contact Between Sikatuna and Legaspi – The site of the historical marker of the Sandugo, or the blood compact between Sikatuna and Legazpi became an issue because of the NHCP board resolution that the event site was located off the waters of Loay and not Tagbilaran. Despite the resolution, the marker remains in its original place.
 The Code of Kalantiaw – This historical marker in Batan, installed on December 8, 1956, remained in place after William Henry Scott in 1968 proved that The Code of Kalantiaw and Datu Kalantiaw to be hoaxes and even after a resolution was issued by the NHI in 2004.
 Ferdinand Marcos 1917–1989 – A historical marker commemorating the centennial birth anniversary of President Ferdinand Marcos in Batac, Ilocos Norte unveiled on September 11, 2017, became controversial and became a case for historical revisionism, following the controversial burial of the late dictator. Baybayin, an Ateneo de Manila student organization, issued an alternative marker online containing atrocities under the Marcos regime, as well as his burial as a statement against historical revisionism. 
 The First Congress of the Republic of the Philippines 1946 ~ 1949 – The marker concerning the first congress is the biggest marker made, measuring at 52x72 inches. The 1946 marker was replaced on January 27, 2010, when governor Carlos Padilla of Nueva Vizcaya asked why his father, Constancio Padilla was missing from the list of the legislators. Luis Taruc, Jesus Lava, and Amado Yuson of the Democratic Alliance were not in the marker even though they appeared in the Congressional Records, while Luis Clarin, Carlos Fortich, and Narciso Ramos were in the 1946 marker but not in the present Congressional Records. The Lava brothers and Yuzon were dismissed from Congress, although the latter moved to the Nacionalista Party. Fortich died before completing his term and was replaced by his widow, Remedios Ozamis Fortich. Ramos won as the congressman for the 5th district of Pangasinan, but was appointed soon after to the United Nations, and was replaced by Cipriano Allas. 
 Francisco "Soc" Rodrigo 1914–1998 – There is the case of a possible relocation of a historical marker dedicated to Francisco "Soc" Rodrigo in Bulakan over ownership issues of the heritage house. 
 Jose Rizal 1861–1896 Tarlak, Tarlak – The historical marker for José Rizal in Tarlac City was reported to be in a state of rot in 2011. The marker was relocated and put in a better position in front of the city plaza after 58 years of neglect.
Labanan sa Karagatan ng Sibuyan Battle of Sibuyan Sea  – Related to the discovered shipwrecks (Japanese ship Musashi) in Sibuyan Island, Romblon, a group has been pushing the transfer of the marker to the said island from the town of Alcantara. 
 La Ignaciana – The historical marker (installed in 1939) of the Jesuit institution La Ignaciana in Santa Ana, Manila was stolen. A replacement marker was planned to be installed by the end of 2014, but it never took place.
 Macapagal-Macaraeg Ancestral House – The marker for the mid-century Macapagal-Macaraeg house in Iligan, issued in 2002, became an issue because President Diosdado Macapagal never lived in the said house, although it became a home for his daughter President Gloria Macapagal Arroyo. 
 Memorare – Days before the Bonifacio Day of 2017, reports surface the demolition of the Bonifacio centennial monument in Makati, along with its historical marker. It was done by the Department of Public Works and Highways to build a bridge connecting Ortigas and Bonifacio Global City business districts without informing and seeking the approval of the NHCP. DPWH, however, stated that it informed the local government unit and temporarily removed the statue to protect it from the construction. The department also said that it has allotted ₱39 million for the restoration of the park after the project has been completed in 2020. 
 Memorare – A statue and marker, named Filipina Comfort Women Statue, remembering the comfort women of World War II, installed on December 8, 2017, along Baywalk, Roxas Boulevard, Malate, Manila, caught the attention from the officials from the Department of Foreign Affairs and the Japanese Embassy in Manila. In response, Teresita Ang-See, said that the memorial should not become an insult versus Japan. On April 27, 2018, the DPWH removed the memorial for a drainage improvement project along the Baywalk. Many individuals and groups, including Gabriela Women's Party condemned the removal, stating historical revisionism and submission to Japanese policy. They also stated that this has been an unlawful removal, since the heritage act protects markers and memorials by the NHCP. President Duterte remarked that the memorial can be placed in a private property, since the state would not want to "antagonize" other countries.
 Mindanao Garden of Peace, Corregidor Island – On March 18, 2015, a marker pertaining to the Jabidah massacre was installed in Corregidor, Cavite City. Despite referring to the said event, the marker was entitled "Mindanao Garden of Peace, Corregidor Island" and the marker text did not contain the name "Jabidah."
 Patricio Mariano (1877–1935) – The historical marker dedicated to Patricio Mariano in Escolta, Binondo, Manila received social media attention regarding its then derelict state. On January 28, 2015, on the occasion of Mariano's 80th death anniversary, the Escolta Revival Movement wrote to the NHCP regarding the situation of the marker. The NHCP renovated the marker the day after. 
 Pisamban Maragul (Pisamban ning Angeles) and Mansyong Pamintuan The Large Church (Church of Angeles) and Pamintuan Mansion –The case of Angeles City markers of Santo Rosario Church and the Pamintuan Mansion became example of markers replaced by new ones bearing rectified information. The latter markers indicate that the anniversary of the Philippine independence was celebrated there in 1899; however, the former venue was discovered to have been the real place of the commemoration.
 Pook Kung Saan Sinulat ang "Filipinas", Liriko ng Pambansang Awit Bautista, Pangasinan Site Where "Filipinas", Lyrics to the National Anthem, was Written Bautista, Pangasinan – Delayed negotiations with the family that owns Casa Hacienda prompted the local government of Bautista to install the marker where Filipinas/Lupang Hinirang was composed to the town's plaza instead.
 Pook Na Kinamatayan ni Doña Aurora Aragon Quezon Deathplace of Aurora Aragon Quezon – A marker was rededicated on the site on April 28, 2013, after the original marker dated February 13, 1991 went missing. The marker in Bongabon stands on the site where Aurora Aragon Quezon was assassinated.
 Unang Putok sa Digmaang Filipino-Amerikano and Tulay ng San Juan First Shot in the Filipino-American War and San Juan Bridge – Following the move to relocate the marker of the first shot of the Filipino-American War from San Juan Bridge to the corner of Sociego and Silencio, Santa Mesa, Manila, former NHI Chairperson Ambeth Ocampo was declared persona non grata in San Juan. The NHI then issued a replacement marker on the bridge, indicating it as a boundary between Filipino and American soldiers during the war, instead of it being the site of the first shot.
 In 2004, the NHCP approved a marker for the Alberto House, Biñan for its historicity in relation to Teodora Alonso, José Rizal, and the city. However, the marker did not push through because the owner refused to follow preservation requests.
 Some markers have been worn out or have faded texts because of natural reasons. There have also been some markers that have been refused to be read by other Filipinos because the language was not in a local one.

Historical markers by region 

These lists of historical markers installed by the National Historical Commission of the Philippines (NHCP) are annotated lists of people, places, or events in the Philippines that have been commemorated by cast-iron plaques issued by the said commission.

There are markers installed by the NHCP outside the Philippines commemorating Philippine-related events, and there are separate lists on these markers, by region.

National Capital Region
Cordillera Administrative Region
Region I: Ilocos Region
Region II: Cagayan Valley
Region III: Central Luzon
Region IV-A: Calabarzon
Region IV-B: Mimaropa
Region V: Bicol Region
Region VI: Western Visayas
Region VII: Central Visayas
Region VIII: Eastern Visayas
Region IX: Zamboanga Peninsula
Region X: Northern Mindanao
Region XI: Davao Region
Region XII: Soccsksargen
Region XIII: Caraga
Bangsamoro Autonomous Region in Muslim Mindanao
Overseas

Gallery

See also
List of Quincentennial historical markers in the Philippines
Lists of Cultural Properties of the Philippines
List of National Cultural Treasures in the Philippines

References

External links

A list of sites and structures with historical markers, as of 16 January 2012
A list of institutions with historical markers, as of 16 January 2012
National Registry of Historic Sites and Structures in the Philippines
Policies on the Installation of Historical Markers
Wikimedia Philippines Historical Markers Map